The Eastern Basketball Alliance was a semi-professional men's winter basketball league. Games were played on the weekends and the season was approximately four months long (January through April).

History
The EBA was formed in 1996 from the fledgling Atlantic Basketball Association. The league played its first season with seven teams. In 1997, the league expanded to ten teams and was incorporated. In 1998, the first EBA commissioner was elected.

From 1999 to 2001, the EBA joined with four ABA teams to form the United Basketball Alliance, but in 2002 they returned to being the EBA.

The EBA took a one-year (2015-16 season) hiatus. The league never returned.

Teams

Teams (2016)

Former teams
 Bad News Ballers
 Beltway Bombers
 Carolina Gladiators
 Diamond City Playaz
 Elmira Bulldogs
 Garden State Rebels
 Hudson Valley Hype
 Lancaster Storm
 Maryland Marvels
 Mercer Marauders
 Metropolitan All-Stars
 Morris Revolution
 New Jersey Bullets
 New York City Jaguars
 New York Wizards
 North Jersey Lakers
 Portsmouth Cavaliers
 Scranton Blast
 South Jersey Enterprise
 Springfield Slamm
 The Destroyers
 Tru Hope Trailblazers
 Virginia Wolverines
 Washington Americans
 Washington Madness
 Washington Warriors
 Westchester Dutchmen

Champions

See also
List of developmental and minor sports leagues

References

External links
Official EBA website
EBA on USBasket

 
Basketball leagues in the United States